The Bangladesh International Arbitration Center (BIAC) is an alternative dispute resolution court in Dhaka, Bangladesh.

History
BIAC was founded in 2011 by a consortium of commercial chambers, including the International Chamber of Commerce, the Dhaka Chamber of Commerce and Industry and the Metropolitan Chamber of Commerce and Industry, with support from the International Finance Corporation of the World Bank Group. It is the first arbitration court in Bangladesh.

See also
Law of Bangladesh
International Court of Arbitration
London Court of International Arbitration

References

External links
 Bangladesh International Arbitration Center website

International arbitration courts and tribunals
Organizations established in 2011
Organisations based in Dhaka